Edwin Scrymgeour (28 July 1866 – 1 February 1947) was a British politician who served as a Member of Parliament (MP) for Dundee in Scotland. He is the only person ever elected to the House of Commons on a prohibitionist ticket, as the candidate of the Scottish Prohibition Party. He was affectionately known as Neddy Scrymgeour.

Life

A native of Dundee, he was educated at West End Academy. He was a pioneer of the Scottish temperance movement and established his party in 1901 to further that aim.

In 1896 he is listed as a clerk, living at 42 Kings Road in Dundee.

He served on Dundee City Council and began contesting elections in the 1908 Dundee by-election, which saw Winston Churchill first elected for Dundee, and Scrymgeour continued to fight at every election thereafter and increased his vote. That was in part because of his popularity, generally left-wing sympathies and history with the labour movement. Churchill's stance against suffragettes may have had an impact in a city that had many women as breadwinners and many men as "kettle-boilers" (househusbands).

In 1910 he was living at 92 Victoria Road in Dundee.

In the 1922 election, Scrymgeour and the Labour candidate, E. D. Morel, jointly ousted Winston Churchill, who had represented the city as a Liberal (to then a Coalition Liberal). Scrymgeour remained an MP for Dundee until the 1931 general election, when he was ousted by Florence Horsbrugh.

Out of Parliament, Scrymgeour worked as an evangelical Chaplain at East House and Maryfield Hospital in Dundee. Scrymgeour was a leader of the unsuccessful opposition to disbanding the Scottish Prohibition Party in 1935. 

He died on 1 February 1947, followed by his wife Margaret on 28 May. Both were interred alongside Scrymgeour's father James in Dundee's Eastern Cemetery.

References

External links
 
 Three Dundonians: James Carmichael, Charles W Boase and Edwin Scrymgeour by SGE Lythe, JT Ward and DG Southgate (Abertay Historical Society 1968)

1866 births
1947 deaths
Members of the Parliament of the United Kingdom for Scottish constituencies
Members of the Parliament of the United Kingdom for Dundee constituencies
Politicians from Dundee
Independent politicians in Scotland
UK MPs 1922–1923
UK MPs 1923–1924
UK MPs 1924–1929
UK MPs 1929–1931
Scottish temperance activists
Councillors in Dundee